Aulonemia tremula is a species of bamboo of the genus Aulonemia.

It is part of the grass family and endemic to Latin America.

References

tremula